The 1998 Rolex 24 at Daytona was a 24-hour endurance sports car race held on February 1, 1998 at the Daytona International Speedway road course. The race served as the opening round of the 1998 United States Road Racing Championship. It was the first year that the race was sanctioned by the SCCA. 

Victory overall and in the Can-Am class went to the No. 30 Doran/Moretti Racing Ferrari 333 SP driven by Giampiero Moretti, Arie Luyendyk, Mauro Baldi, and Didier Theys. Victory in the GT1 class went to the No. 01 Rohr Motorsport Porsche 911 GT1 driven by Allan McNish, Danny Sullivan, Jörg Müller, Uwe Alzen, and Dirk Müller. The GT2 class was won by the No. 97 Konrad Motorsport Porsche 911 GT2 driven by Toni Seiler, Wido Rössler, Peter Kitchak, Angelo Zadra, and Franz Konrad. Finally, the GT3 class was won by the No. 10 Prototype Technology Group, Inc. BMW M3 E36 driven by Bill Auberlen, Marc Duez, Boris Said, and Peter Cunningham.

Race results
Class winners in bold.

References

External links
Car Information & Images
RacingReference.com
Race Results

24 Hours of Daytona
1998 in sports in Florida
1998 in American motorsport